Shammas is a surname. Notable people with the surname include:

Anton Shammas (born 1950), Palestinian writer and poet
Carole Shammas (born 1943), American historian, academic, and author
Hazem Shammas, Palestinian-Australian actor